Megan Boone (born April 29, 1983) is an American actress. She is best known for her role as FBI agent and profiler Elizabeth Keen on the NBC drama series The Blacklist. She had a recurring role in Law & Order: LA and an episodic appearance in Blue Bloods. She has appeared in films such as My Bloody Valentine 3D (2009) and Step Up Revolution (2012).

Early life and education
Boone was born in Petoskey, Michigan, and raised in The Villages, Florida. Her parents relocated there when she was a child to be closer to her grandparents. Her grandfather, billionaire H. Gary Morse, was the developer of The Villages; her mother, Jennifer Parr, is the Director of Sales. Boone says that she was "hooked" on acting at age seven when her grandparents took her to New York to see a Broadway play starring Nathan Lane.

Megan Boone's ancestry is English and German with some smaller amounts of Dutch and Scottish.

Boone studied acting as a student at Belleview High School, where she graduated in 2001. In 2005, she graduated from Florida State University's School of Theatre with a Bachelor of Fine Arts (BFA) in Acting. Boone studied with Jane Alexander and Edwin Sherin at the Asolo Repertory Theatre and workshopped with playwright Mark Medoff. Boone credits Alexander with influencing her to continue acting though she considered quitting early in her career. In late 2017, Boone began studying for an MBA in Sustainability from Bard College In New York.

Career 
Boone starred in the 2007 Los Angeles debut of the Charles L. Mee play Limonade Tous Les Jours and won two LA Weekly Theater Awards for her performance. Boone made her feature film debut in the horror film My Bloody Valentine 3D (2009), followed by a supporting role in Sex and the City 2 in 2010. During 2010 in her year in television, she portrayed Junior Deputy District Attorney Lauren Stanton in the short-lived NBC series Law & Order: LA. That same year, Boone made her directorial debut with the independent film Eggshells for Soil, portions of which were shot in her hometown, The Villages, Florida. She has also appeared in Step Up Revolution (2012), the fourth film in the Step Up series.

Boone would later receive a starring role in the independent drama Leave Me Like You Found Me (2012), for which she won the Gen Art Film Festival Award for Best Actress. She had a recurring role on the CBS police drama series Blue Bloods in 2013, followed by her starring role of FBI agent Elizabeth Keen in the NBC series The Blacklist the same year. The Blacklist achieved both critical and public success, including good DVR ratings scores. On June 15, 2021, it was announced that Boone would be leaving The Blacklist after eight seasons. More recently, she and her Weird Sister production company signed a first look deal with Sony Pictures Television.

Personal life
In November 2015, Boone's representative confirmed she and artist Dan Estabrook were expecting their first child together. In January 2016, during an appearance on Live! with Kelly and Michael, Boone revealed she and Estabrook were engaged and expecting a girl. 
Boone gave birth to a daughter, Caroline, that year.

Filmography

Film

Television

References

External links

 

1983 births
Living people
Actresses from Florida
American film actresses
American people of English descent
American people of German descent
American people of Hungarian-Jewish descent
American stage actresses
American television actresses
Florida State University alumni
21st-century American actresses
People from The Villages, Florida
People from Petoskey, Michigan
American environmentalists
American women environmentalists